Articles related to the British Overseas Territory of South Georgia and the South Sandwich Islands include:

0–9

.gs – Internet country code top-level domain for South Georgia and the South Sandwich Islands

A
Acorn Rock
Americas
South America
South Atlantic Ocean
Islands of South Georgia and the South Sandwich Islands
Anthony de la Roché
Atlantic Ocean
Atlas of South Georgia and the South Sandwich Islands
Aurora Islands
Austral thrush

B
Black-necked swan
Blue petrel
Brighton Beach (South Georgia)
British Overseas Territory of South Georgia and the South Sandwich Islands
Buff-necked ibis
Busen Point

C

Cape Rosa
Capital of South Georgia and the South Sandwich Islands:  King Edward Point on South Georgia Island
Carl Anton Larsen
Categories:
:Category:South Georgia and the South Sandwich Islands
:Category:Environment of South Georgia and the South Sandwich Islands
:Category:Geography of South Georgia and the South Sandwich Islands
:Category:History of South Georgia and the South Sandwich Islands
:Category:Military of South Georgia and the South Sandwich Islands
:Category:South Georgia and the South Sandwich Islands-related lists
:Category:Communications and Broadcasting of South Georgia and South Sandwich Islands
commons:Category:South Georgia and the South Sandwich Islands
Coat of arms of South Georgia and the South Sandwich Islands
Commissioner for South Georgia and the South Sandwich Islands
Commonwealth of Nations
Communications in South Georgia and the South Sandwich Islands
Compañía Argentina de Pesca
Corbeta Uruguay
Coscoroba swan
Cinema in South Georgia and South Sandwich Islands

D
Demographics of South Georgia and the South Sandwich Islands
Discovery Committee
Discovery Investigations
Ducloz Head
Duncan Carse

E
Echo Pass
Ems Rock
English colonization of the Americas
Ernesto Pass
Esbensen Bay
Evans Lake (South Georgia)

F

Flag of South Georgia and the South Sandwich Islands
Flora of South Georgia
Flying steamer duck
Foreign relations of South Georgia and the South Sandwich Islands
Framnaes Point
Franklin's gull

G
Geography of South Georgia and the South Sandwich Islands
Gjelstad Pass
Godthul
Gold Harbour
Goldcrest Point
Gony Point
Grytviken
Grytviken
Gulbrandsen Lake
Gull Lake, South Georgia

H
Hestesletten
History of South Georgia and the South Sandwich Islands
Husvik

I
Imperial Trans-Antarctic Expedition#South Georgia crossing
International Organization for Standardization (ISO)
ISO 3166-1 alpha-2 country code for South Georgia and the South Sandwich Islands: GS
ISO 3166-1 alpha-3 country code for South Georgia and the South Sandwich Islands: SGS
Islands of South Georgia and the South Sandwich Islands

J

K
King Edward Point on South Georgia Island – Capital of South Georgia and the South Sandwich Islands

L
Languages of South Georgia and the South Sandwich Islands
Leith Harbour
Lists related to South Georgia and the South Sandwich Islands:
List of islands of South Georgia and the South Sandwich Islands
List of mammals in South Georgia and the South Sandwich Islands
List of prominent South Georgians
List of South Georgia and the South Sandwich Islands-related topics
Topic outline of South Georgia and the South Sandwich Islands

M
Mammals of South Georgia and the South Sandwich Islands
Military of South Georgia and the South Sandwich Islands

N

O
Ocean Harbour
Operation Paraquet

P
Peggotty Bluff
Politics of South Georgia and the South Sandwich Islands
Possession Bay
Prince Olav Harbour
Prominent South Georgians
Protector Shoal

Q

R
Rosita Harbour
Rosybill
Radio Stations in South Georgia and South Sandwich Islands
Radio South Georgia and South Sandwich Islands

S
Salisbury Plain, South Georgia
Solveig Gunbjørg Jacobsen
South American snipe
South Georgia and the South Sandwich Islands
South Georgia Museum
South Georgia pipit
Southern rough-winged swallow
Sovereignty of South Georgia and the South Sandwich Islands
Stromness, South Georgia
Subantarctic
Survey Isthmus

T
Teal Ponds
Thatcher Peninsula
Topic outline of South Georgia and the South Sandwich Islands

U
United Kingdom of Great Britain and Northern Ireland

V
 Viktor Esbensen
 Voyage of the James Caird#South Georgia

W
White-crested elaenia

X

Y

Z

See also

List of international rankings
Lists of country-related topics
Topic outline of geography
Topic outline of South America

External links

 
South Georgia and the South Sandwich Islands